Wat Buddhapadipa or the Buddhapadipa Temple is a Thai Buddhist temple (wat) in Wimbledon, London.

Building work on the temple and shrine started in 1979 and it was completed in 1982. The architect was Praves Limparangsi (1930–2018) a renowned Thai architect, named by the Thai Culture Ministry as National Artists for Architecture in 1989. Funding was provided by the Thai Government and the main building is known as the Uposatha. Inside, the murals are painted by 26 young Thai artists between 1984–1992.

It was the first such temple to be built in the United Kingdom. It is home to monks and nuns, but welcomes visitors of any faith to view the grounds and temple as long as they are respectful to the building.

Its white exterior walls are put into contrast by the red and gold colours of the roof and decorations of the frames of the windows and doors.

Inside the temple hall, the walls are covered with paintings showing the life of the Buddha—from his birth to his death. There are pictures of his birth in Lumbini (Nepal), his renunciation, his enlightenment, and finally his death. The murals were painted by artists Chalermchai Kositpipat and Panya Vijinthanasarn in a surreal style using brilliant colors that, at first glance, seems very unlike classical Thai painting. However, they revive the tendency found in traditional Thai mural paintings to situate episodes from Buddhist myth in scenes populated with figures and objects from contemporary life. The murals were started in the 1980s, and among the many figures in the scenes are portraits of Mother Teresa and Margaret Thatcher, as well as the temple's patrons and the artists themselves.

The main doorway leading out from the shrine room  has a grand painting of the Buddha meditating to reach enlightenment, directly above it. On the right side of the Buddha are the angry figures of Mara's army, trying to disrupt the Buddha, and distract him from reaching enlightenment. The name 'Mara' means delusion. On the left side of the Buddha is the army of Mara looking more subdued and respectful. They are like this because the Buddha has reached enlightenment, and they could not distract him. Just above the doorway is the figure of Nang Thoranee, the earth goddess. During the climax of Mara's assault, the Buddha touches the earth with his hand. The earth goddess appears to bear witness to the merit the Buddha has accumulated in his many lives, and the water she squeezes from her hair washes away the armies of Mara. The episode is known as Maravijaya Attitude.

Also in the room is a great shrine built for the Buddha. There are three statues of the Buddha in it; the back one is black, the middle statue is gold, and the front statue is green and smaller than the other two. These statues are surrounded by candles and other decorations.

Also within the grounds are a house, pond, and several bridges. In the gardens signs are posted, each sign giving a message of wisdom to those who stop to read them.

The temple is open from 9am to 6pm daily.

On 30 January 2023, the Sangha Supreme Council appointed Chao Khun Laow Panyasiri as the abbot of Wat Buddhapadipa. (He had been the acting abbot since 25 November 2022.)

References

Further reading

External links

1980s establishments in England
Buddhist temples in London
Overseas Thai Buddhist temples
Religious buildings and structures in the London Borough of Merton
Thai diaspora in Europe
Thai Theravada Buddhist temples and monasteries